Captain Fracasse (Italian: Capitan Fracassa) is a 1940 Italian historical adventure film directed by Duilio Coletti and starring Elsa De Giorgi, Giorgio Costantini and Osvaldo Valenti. It was made at the Cinecittà studios in Rome. The film is based on the 1863 novel of the same name by Théophile Gautier. Another adaptation Captain Fracasse was made three years later as a co-production between France and Italy.

Cast
 Elsa De Giorgi as Isabella  
 Giorgio Costantini as Il barone di Sigognac / Capitan Fracassa  
 Osvaldo Valenti as Il duca Ruggero di Vallombrosa  
 Nerio Bernardi as Il principe  
 Clara Calamai as Iolanda De Foix  
 Olga Vittoria Gentilli as Leonarda, la madre nobile  
 Egisto Olivieri as Il tiranno & il capocomico  
 Renato Chiantoni as Scapino  
 Ernesto Gentili as Leandro  
 Pia De Doses as Zerbina  
 Mario Siletti as Giacomo Lampourde  
 Fiorella Betti as Chiquita  
 Guido Morisi as Vidalino  
 Dina Perbellini as La marchesa Di Bruyeres  
 Franco Coop as Il falso brigante  
 Ernesto Bianchi as Matamoro  
 Umberto Casilini as Pietro, il vecchio servitore dei Sigognac 
 Gildo Bocci as Il capitano delle guardie 
 Arnaldo Firpo
 Fedele Gentile
 Romano Karninki 
 Carlo Mariotti 
 Carla Pedroni 
 Nico Pepe

References

Bibliography 
 Goble, Alan. The Complete Index to Literary Sources in Film. Walter de Gruyter, 1999.

External links 
 

1940 films
1940s Italian-language films
Italian historical adventure films
1940s historical adventure films
Films directed by Duilio Coletti
Films set in the 17th century
Films shot at Cinecittà Studios
Italian black-and-white films
Films based on Captain Fracasse
1940s Italian films